Ri Hyon-Song  is a North Korean footballer who plays as a midfielder.

References 

Living people
1992 births
North Korean footballers
North Korea international footballers
Association football midfielders